Three Leaning Men were a 1980s band from Palmerston North who released one LP called Fun in the Key of E. The band played many support gigs including their debut supporting Sneaky Feelings at the Massey University Social Hall.  Also supported Hunters & Collectors, The Chills and New Order.  Formed by Lindsay Gregg (guitar), Rhys Bevan (bass) and Nigel Corbett (drums) and joined by second guitarist Greg Malcolm. Rhys Bevan was replaced by Alan Gregg during the recording of the album Fun in the Key of E. Alan Gregg has gone on to feature in a number of other New Zealand bands including The Dribbling Darts of Love, The Mutton Birds and Marshmallow. Rhys Bevan moved to the South Island of New Zealand to continue his career as a baker. Guitarist Lindsay Gregg died in 2011.

References 

New Zealand musical groups